Miguel Castro (12 December 1910 – 12 June 1972) was a Chilean middle-distance runner. He competed in the men's 1500 metres at the 1936 Summer Olympics.

References

1910 births
1972 deaths
Athletes (track and field) at the 1936 Summer Olympics
Chilean male middle-distance runners
Olympic athletes of Chile
Place of birth missing